Numerous Indigenous Australians are noted for their participation in, and contributions to, the Visual arts of Australia and abroad. Contemporary Indigenous Australian art is a national movement of international significance with work by Indigenous artists, including paintings by those from the Western Desert, achieving widespread critical acclaim.

Because naming conventions for Indigenous Australians vary widely, this list is ordered by first name rather than surname.

List

Ada Andy Napaltjarri
Albert Namatjira
Alison Milyika Carroll
Alma Nungarrayi Granites (1955-2017), artist
Anatjari Tjakamarra
Angelina Pwerle
Anniebell Marrngamarrnga
Archie Moore
Banduk Marika
Barbara McGrady
Barbara Weir
Betty Muffler
Biddy Rockman Napaljarri
Bill Yidumduma Harney
Billy Stockman Tjapaltjarri
Bronwyn Bancroft
Brook Andrew
Cassidy Possum Tjapaltjarri
Charmaine Green
Cheryl Moggs
Christian Thompson
Clifford Possum Tjapaltjarri
Daisy Jugadai Napaltjarri
Danie Mellor
Daniel Boyd
Darren Siwes
David Malangi
David Miller
Dhambit Mununggurr
Dhuwarrwarr Marika
Dick Roughsey
Digby Moran
Dorothy Djukulul
Dorothy Napangardi
Eileen Napaltjarri
Emily Kame Kngwarreye
Fiona Foley
Freddy Timms
Galuma Maymuru
Gavin Wanganeen
Gertie Huddleston
Gloria Petyarre
Gordon Bennett
Harold Thomas
Helen Nelson Napaljarri
Ian Abdulla
Jack Dale Mengenen
Jackie Kurltjunyintja Giles
Jean Baptiste Apuatimi
Jennifer Herd
Jimmy Pike Kurnti Kujarri
John Mawurndjul
John Moriarty
Johnny Bulunbulun
Josepha (Josie) Petrick Kemarre
Judy Watson
Judy Watson Napangardi
Juju Wilson
Karla Dickens
Kathleen Kemarre Wallace
Kathleen Ngale
Kathleen Petyarre
Katie West
Kay Lindjuwanga
Kitty Pultara Napaljarri
Leah King-Smith
Lily Kelly Napangardi
Lin Onus
Linda Syddick Napaltjarri
Lisa Bellear
Lorraine Connelly-Northey (mixed heritage)
Louisa Napaljarri
Lucy Napaljarri Kennedy
Mabel Juli
Maggie Napaljarri Ross
Makinti Napanangka
Malaluba Gumana
Margaret Scobie
Maria Josette Orsto
Mavis Ngallametta
Mawukura (Mulgra) Jimmy Nerrimah
Megan Cope
Mervyn Bishop
Michael Nelson Tjakamarra
Michael Riley
Mick Namarari Tjapaltjarri
Minnie Pwerle
Mithinarri Gurruwiwi
Molly Jugadai Napaltjarri
Mona Rockman Napaljarri
Naata Nungurrayi
Naomi Hobson
Narputta Nangala
Ngoia Pollard Napaltjarri
Nici Cumpston
Nonggirrnga Marawili
Nora Andy Napaltjarri
Norah Nelson Napaljarri
Nyakul Dawson
Nyapanyapa Yunupingu
Nyuju Stumpy Brown
Nyurpaya Kaika Burton
Olga Miller
Paddy Bedford
Paddy Japaljarri Stewart
Paji Honeychild Yankarr
Pantjiti Mary McLean
Pansy Napangardi
Parara Napaltjarri
Peggy Napangardi Jones 
Peggy Rockman Napaljarri
Queenie McKenzie
r e a
Regina Pilawuk Wilson
Rerrkirrwanga Mununggurr 
Revel Cooper
Richard Bell
Rosella Namok
Rover Thomas
Sally Morgan
Sheila Brown Napaljarri
Shirley Macnamara
Shirley Purdie
Sid Domic
Susie Bootja Bootja Napaltjarri
Takariya Napaltjarri
Therese Ryder
Timmy Payungka Tjapangati
Tjunkiya Napaltjarri
Tjyllyungoo (Lance Chadd)
Tom Djäwa (also known as Djäwa Daygurrgurr)
Tommy Watson
Tony Albert
Topsy Gibson Napaljarri
Tracey Moffatt 
Valerie Lynch Napaltjarri
Vernon Ah Kee
Vincent Namatjira 
Wandjuk Marika
Wenten Rubuntja
Wintjiya Napaltjarri
William Barak
Yilpi Adamson

See also
 List of Indigenous Australian art movements and cooperatives
List of Indigenous Australian musicians
List of Indigenous Australian writers
Indigenous Australian art

References

Visual
Visual
Visual
Visual artists
Lists of visual artists